Wet sari scenes are an on-screen cliché in Hindi cinema films, in which fully clothed actresses are depicted in wet saris that cling to their bodies. This functions as a proxy for nudity in mainstream Indian cinema, where nudity is taboo.

According to Pooja Makhijani, in an interview with rediff.com:

Bollywood is wonderfully escapist. And completely comforting, as nothing really changes. Every blockbuster has at least one of the following: a wet sari scene, an over-the-top dance number with hundreds of mustachioed extras, an overbearing patriarch, pehla pyar (first love), and a wonderfully choreographed fight sequence in which the police show up the second the bad guys are down and out.

Films showing wet sari scenes include Mera Naam Joker (1970), Satyam Shivam Sundaram (1978), Ram Teri Ganga Maili (1985) and Kishen Kanhaiya (1990).

See also
 Wet T-shirt contest
 Wetlook

References

Further reading 
 
 
 
   Includes information about the first wet sari scene, in the 1913 film Raja Harischandra.

Hindi cinema
Saris
Tropes